"I'll Kiss Your Memory" is the first solo single written, performed and produced by Barry Gibb, released in May 1970. It peaked at number 16 in the Netherlands. The song was intended for Gibb's unreleased debut album The Kid's No Good.

Background

Recording
The song features an echo vocal with an arrangement of orchestra by Bill Shepherd. This song was recorded in IBC Studios on 15 February and finished on 20 February with "The Victim", "Moonlight" and "Summer Ends". "It's not the same orchestra as we used with the Bee Gees", Gibb explained, "But Bill Shepherd is the only arranger I'll ever work with. On the single ['I'll Kiss Your Memory'] I double-tracked my voice seven times, because I knew exactly how I wanted everything done."

Release
The single was released in the U.K. and the U.S., but did not chart. The CD version of the song was available in the compilation Tales from the Brothers Gibb.  This track's stereo mix was released in 1974 on I've Gotta Get a Message to You (1974).

Personnel
 Barry Gibb – lead and harmony vocals, rhythm guitar
 Bill Shepherd – orchestra and strings arrangement

Chart performance

References

1970 debut singles
1970 songs
Barry Gibb songs
Songs written by Barry Gibb
Song recordings produced by Barry Gibb
Polydor Records singles